The prison abolition movement is a network of groups and activists that seek to reduce or eliminate prisons and the prison system, and replace them with systems of rehabilitation that do not place a focus on punishment and government institutionalization. The prison abolitionist movement is distinct from conventional prison reform, which is the attempt to improve conditions inside prisons.

Some supporters of decarceration and prison abolition also work to end solitary confinement, the death penalty, and the construction of new prisons through non-reformist reform. Others support books-to-prisoner projects and defend the rights of prisoners to have access to information and library services. Some organizations, such as the Anarchist Black Cross, seek total abolishment of the prison system, without any intention to replace it with other government-controlled systems. Many anarchist organizations believe that the best form of justice arises naturally out of social contracts, restorative justice, or transformative justice.

Definition 
Scholar Dorothy Roberts takes the prison abolition movement in the United States to endorse three basic theses:

 "[T]oday’s carceral punishment system can be traced back to slavery and the racial capitalist regime it relied on and sustained."
 "[T]he expanding criminal punishment system functions to oppress black people and other politically marginalized groups in order to maintain a racial capitalist regime."
 "[W]e can imagine and build a more humane and democratic society that no longer relies on caging people to meet human needs and solve social problems."

Thus, Roberts situates the theory of prison abolition within an intellectual tradition including scholars such as Cedric Robinson, who developed the concept of racial capitalism, and characterizes the movement as a response to a long history of oppressive treatment of black people in the United States. In Canada, many abolitionists have called Canada's prisons the "new residential schools", which were designed as a cultural genocide of Indigenous people.

Legal scholar Allegra McLeod notes that prison abolition is not merely a negative project of "opening … prison doors", but rather "may be understood instead as a gradual project of decarceration, in which radically different legal and institutional regulatory forms supplant criminal law enforcement." Prison abolition, in McLeod's view, involves a positive agenda that reimagines how societies might deal with social problems in the absence of prisons, using techniques such as decriminalization and improved welfare provision.

Like Roberts, McLeod sees the contemporary theory of prison abolition as linked to theories regarding the abolition of slavery. McLeod notes that W. E. B. Du Bois—particularly in his Black Reconstruction in America—saw abolitionism not only as a movement to end the legal institution of property in human beings, but also as a means of bringing about a "different future" wherein former slaves could enjoy full participation in society. (Davis explicitly took inspiration from Du Bois's concept of "abolition democracy" in her Abolition Democracy.) Similarly, on McLeod's view, prison abolition implies broad changes to social institutions: "[a]n abolitionist framework", she writes, "requires positive forms of social integration and collective security that are not organized around criminal law enforcement, confinement, criminal surveillance, punitive policing, or punishment."

The abolition of prisons is not only about the closure of prisons. Abolitionist views is also a way to counter the hegemonic discourse, and gives an alternative ways of thinking. It is a way to reconceptualize basic notions like crime, innocence, punishment etc.

Historical development

Anarchism and Prison Abolition 
Anarchist opposition to incarceration can be found in articles written as early as 1851, and is elucidated by major anarchist thinkers such as Proudhon, Bakunin, Berkman, Goldman, Malatesta, Bonano, and Kropotkin. 

Personal experiences in prison because of revolutionary activity prompted many anarchists who were “deeply affected by their experiences” to publish their criticisms. In 1886, the trial of eight anarchists following the Haymarket riots brought state repression to public attention. Lucy Parsons, an anarchist and wife of one of the Haymarket eight, embarked on a speaking tour through 17 different states speaking to a total of almost 200,000 people. A single rally in Cuba, Havana, to support the families of the eight accused anarchists raised nearly $1000. Speaking at his trial, in a widely disseminated speech, one of the co-accused, August Spies, stated:It is not likely that the honorable Bonfield and Grinnell can conceive of a social order not held intact by the policeman's club and pistol, nor of a free society without prisons, gallows, and State's attorneys. In such a society they probably fail to find a place for themselves. And is this the reason why Anarchism is such a "pernicious and damnable doctrine?"The Anarchist Red Cross, a prisoner support group and the precursor to the Anarchist Black Cross, was founded roughly in 1906. By that year, groups existed in Kiev, Odessa, Bialystok, and trials of its members, led to its spread across Europe and North America. A 2018 guide to starting an Anarchist Black Cross group states that "we need to destroy all the prisons, and free all the prisoners. Our position is an abolitionist stance against the state and it’s prisons."

In 1917, the Anarchist Red Cross would disband and members joined the revolution in Russia. Following the February revolution, political prisoners were released from Russian jails, in a massive wave of amnesties. The Anarchist Red Cross reorganised in 1919 as the Anarchist Black Cross, with some members joining the anarchist insurgent, Nestor Makhno. 

Makhno, a Ukrainian anarchist who was freed in 1917 from a life sentence in prison, organised a revolutionary insurgent army along anarchist principles that would come to control a territory of seven-and-a-half million people. Upon taking control of a town, Makhnovists would destroy “all remnants and symbols of slavery: prisons, police and gendarmerie posts were blown up with dynamite or put to the torch.” Prisoners in battle who were not officers were typically welcomed into the ranks of Makhnovists or freed. The Makhnovist revolutionary insurgent army adopted a declaration in 1919, stating we are against all rigid judicial and police machinery, against any legislative code prescribed once and for all time, for these involve gross violations of genuine justice and of the real protections of the population. These ought not to be organized but should be instead the living, free and creative act of the community. Which is why all obsolete forms of justice — court administration, revolutionary tribunals, repressive laws, police or militia, Cheka, prisons and all other sterile and useless anachronisms — must disappear of themselves or be abolished from the very first breath of the free life, right from the very first steps of the free and living organization of society and the economy.The Anarchist Black Cross was reconstituted in the aftermath of the Spanish Civil War and Anarchist Revolution. The pressure from the number of anarchist prisoners in need of aid, led to the closing of “most of the chapters in the United States and Europe.” Alternative groups, such as the Alexander Berkman Aid Fund and the Society to Aid Anarchist Prisoners in Russia would take their place. Another resurgence was felt in 1967, and, again, in 1979 owing to the efforts of Lorenzo Kom’boa Ervin whose writings on prison and anarchism are credited as having spread and been foundational to Black anarchism. 

Anarchists agitation against prisons in Canada has included Bulldozer, an anti-prison anarchist project founded in Toronto in 1980. Bulldozer was closed after being raided and charged with sedition. The End the Prison Industrial Complex (Epic) was formed in 2009, and Anarchist Black Cross projects emerged throughout the 2000s. Anarchists and abolitionists within Québec organise yearly noise demonstrations outside of prison facilities on New Year’s Eve. A campaign to stop the construction of a migrant prison involved anarchists unloading thousands of crickets into the offices of an architectural firm in 2018.

Campaigns to free anarchist prisoners have served as the basis for calling for freedom for all prisoners. June 11, 2011, international solidarity actions for anarchist prisoners Marie Mason and Eric McDavid triggered the start of an international day and week of solidarity with all anarchist prisoners in 2015. 2022's week of solidarity included actions in Poland, Russia, Ukraine, Uruguay, Greece, the UK, and other countries. The 2022-2023 hunger strike of anarchist prisoner Alfredo Cospito led to police skirmishes with protesters in Rome, a Turin cell tower being lit on fire, and a letter with bullets was sent to a newspaper stating "if Alfredo Cospito dies judges will all be targets, two months without food, burn down the prisons." International actions to free Cospito, included the burning of a Strabag excavator in Germany. The Italian placed their embassies on "alert" in response to mobilizations.

The Rojavan Revolution, which many have considered illustrative of, and rooted in, anarchist theory, involved the mass liquidation of prisons and freeing of political prisoners and nonviolent offenders. Neighbourhood based "peace committees," composed of elected community members with, largely, no formal legal education, were created to resolve conflicts using a model of consensus and restorative justice.

Prison Abolition and the New Left 
Angela Davis traces the roots of contemporary prison abolition theory at least to Thomas Mathiesen's 1974 book The Politics of Abolition, which had been published in the wake of the Attica Prison uprising and unrest in European prisons around the same time. She also cites activist Fay Honey Knopp's 1976 work Instead of Prisons: A Handbook for Abolitionists as significant in the movement.

Eduardo Bautista Duran and Jonathan Simon point out that George Jackson's 1970 text Soledad Brother drew global attention to the conditions of prisons in the United States and made prison abolition a tenet of the New Left.

Liz Samuels observes that, following the Attica Prison uprising, activists began to coalesce around a vision of abolition, whereas previously they had endorsed a program of reform.

1973 Walpole Prison uprising 

In 1973, two years after the Attica Prison uprising, the inmates of Walpole prison, in Massachusetts, formed a prisoners' union to protect themselves from guards, end behavioral modification programs, advocate for the prisoner's right for education and healthcare, gain more visitation rights, work assignments, and to be able to send money to their families.

The union also created a general truce within the prison and race-related violence sharply declined.  During the Kwanzaa celebration, black prisoners were placed under lockdown, angering the whole facility and leading to a general strike. Prisoners refused to work or leave their cells for three months, to which the guards responded by beating prisoners, putting prisoners in solitary confinement, and denying prisoners medical care and food.

The strike ended in the prisoners' favour as the superintendent of the prison resigned. The prisoners were granted more visitation rights and work programs. Angered by this, the prison guards went on strike and abandoned the prison, hoping that this would create chaos and violence throughout the prison. But the prisoners were able to create an anarchist community where recidivism dropped dramatically and murders and rapes fell to zero. Prisoners volunteered to cook meals. Vietnam veterans who had been trained as medics took charge of the pharmacy and distribution of medication. Decisions were made in community assemblies.

Guards retook the prison after two months, leading to many prison administrators and bureaucrats quitting their jobs and embracing the prison abolition movement.

Advocates of prison abolition 

Angela Davis writes: "Mass incarceration is not a solution to unemployment, nor is it a solution to the vast array of social problems that are hidden away in a rapidly growing network of prisons and jails. However, the great majority of people have been tricked into believing in the efficacy of imprisonment, even though the historical record clearly demonstrates that prisons do not work."

Angela Davis and Ruth Wilson Gilmore co-founded Critical Resistance, which is an organization working to "build an international movement to end the Prison Industrial Complex by challenging the belief that caging and controlling people makes us safe." Other similarly motivated groups such as the Prison Activist Resource Center (PARC), a group "committed to exposing and challenging all forms of institutionalized racism, sexism, able-ism, heterosexism, and classism, specifically within the Prison Industrial Complex," and Black & Pink, an abolitionist organization that focuses around LGBTQ rights, all broadly advocate for prison abolition. Furthermore, the Human Rights Coalition, a 2001 group that aims to abolish prisons, and the California Coalition for Women Prisoners, a grassroots organization dedicated to dismantling the PIC, can all be added to the long list of organizations that desire a different form of justice system.

Since 1983, the International Conference on Penal Abolition (ICOPA) gathers activists, academics, journalists, and "others from across the world who are working towards the abolition of imprisonment, the penal system, carceral controls and the prison industrial complex (PIC)," to discuss three important questions surrounding the reality of prison abolition ICOPA was one of the first penal abolitionist conference movements, similar to Critical Resistance in America, but "with an explicitly international scope and agenda-setting ambition."

Anarchists wish to eliminate all forms of state control, of which imprisonment is seen as one of the more obvious examples. Anarchists also oppose prisons given that statistics show incarceration rates affect mainly poor people and ethnic minorities, and do not generally rehabilitate criminals, in many cases making them worse. As a result, the prison abolition movement often is associated with humanistic socialism, anarchism and anti-authoritarianism.

In October 2015, members at a plenary session of the National Lawyers Guild (NLG) released and adopted a resolution in favor of prison abolition.

In Canada, a number of organizations support prison abolition, which includes the Saskatchewan Manitoba Alberta Abolition Organization (SMAAC) or the Toronto Prisoners’ Rights Project. These organizations collaborate and organize on issues of prison abolition and work towards prison abolition.

Disability, mental illness and prison 

Prison abolitionists such as Amanda Pustilnik take issue with the fact that prisons are used as a "default asylum" for many individuals with mental illness: 
Why do governmental units choose to spend billions of dollars a year to concentrate people with serious illnesses in a system designed to punish intentional lawbreaking, when doing so matches neither the putative purposes of that system nor most effectively addresses the issues posed by that population? 

In the United States, there are more people with mental illness in prisons than in psychiatric hospitals. In Canada, mental health issues are 2 to 3 time more prevalent in Canadian prisons than in the general population. This statistic is one of the major pieces of evidence that prison abolitionists claim highlights the depravity of the penal system. 

Prison abolitionists contend that prisons violate the Constitutional rights (5th and 6th Amendment rights) of mentally ill prisoners on the grounds that these individuals will not be receiving the same potential for rehabilitation as the non-mentally ill prison population.  This injustice is sufficient grounds to argue for the abolishment of prisons. Prisons were not designed to be used to house the mentally ill, and prison practices like solitary confinement are damaging to mental health. Additionally, individuals with mental illnesses have a much higher chance of committing suicide while in prison.

In response to the fear that prisons are needed for the most serious cases of mentally ill, Liat Ben-Mosh describe prison abolitionist's' view on the issue: "Many prison abolitionists advocate for transformative justice and healing practices in which no one will be restrained or segregated, while some, like PREAP, believe that there will always be a small percentage of those whose behavior is so unacceptable or harmful that they will need to be incapacitated, socially exiled, or restrained and that this should be done humanely, temporarily, and not in a carceral or punitive manner." Another point raised is that the current focus in criminal justice reform on nonviolent, nonserious and nonsexual offences shrinks the borders and understandings of innocence and guilt.

Aging in prison 
The prison abolition movement and prison abolitionists, like Liat Ben-Moshe have taken issue with the treatment of the aging population in prisons. Prolonged sentencing policies have resulted in an increased aging population in prisons as well as the harsh conditions of imprisonment. A number of reasons can contribute to older adult's risk for illness while in prison. Prisons are not intended to be used as nursing homes, hospice or long-term care facilities for the aging prison population. 

In Canada, individuals 50 years of age and older in federal custody account for 25% of the federal prison population. Investigations into the Canadian federal penitentiary have found that there is a general failure of the Correctional Service of Canada to meet safe and humane custody and assisting in the rehabilitation and reintegration of offenders into the community. The conditions of confinement of older individuals jeopardize the protection of their human rights. The conditions of the aging population in Canada has been denounced by persons who are incarcerated.

Proposed reforms and alternatives 

Proposals for prison reform and alternatives to prisons differ significantly depending on the political beliefs behind them. Often they fall in one of three categories from the "Attrition Model", a model proposed by the Prison Research Education Action Project in 1976: moratorium, decarceration, and excarceration. Proposals and tactics often include:

 Penal system reforms:
 Substituting, for incarceration, supervised release, probation, restitution to victims, and/or community work.
 Decreasing terms of imprisonment by abolishing mandatory minimum sentencing
 Decreasing ethnic disparity in prison populations
 Prison condition reforms
 Crime prevention rather than punishment
 Abolition of specific programs which increase prison population, such as the prohibition of drugs (e.g., the American War on Drugs) and prohibition of sex work.
 Education programs to inform people who have never been in prison about the problems
 Fighting individual cases of wrongful conviction

The United Nations Office on Drugs and Crime published a series of handbooks on criminal justice. Among them is Alternatives to Imprisonment which identifies how the overuse of imprisonment impacts fundamental human rights, especially those convicted for lesser crimes.

Social justice and advocacy organizations such as Students Against Mass Incarceration (SAMI) at the University of California, San Diego often look to Scandinavian countries Sweden and Norway for guidance in regard to successful prison reform because both countries have an emphasis on rehabilitation rather than punishment. According to Sweden's Prison and Probation Service Director-General, Nils Öberg, this emphasis is popular among the Swedish because the act of imprisonment is considered punishment enough. This focus on rehabilitation includes an emphasis on promoting normalcy for inmates, a charge lead by experienced criminologists and psychologists. In Norway a focus on preparation for societal re-entry has yielded "one of the lowest recidivism rates in the world at 20%, [while] the US has one of the highest: 76.6% of [American] prisoners are re-arrested within five years". The Scandinavian method of incarceration seems to be successful: the Swedish incarceration rate decreased by 6% between 2011 and 2012.

Abolitionist views 
Many prison reform organizations and abolitionists in the United States advocate community accountability practices, such as community-controlled courts, councils, or assemblies as an alternative to the criminal justice system. 

Instead of prisons: a handbook for abolitionists, republished by Critical Resistance in 2005, outlines what they identify as the nine main perspectives for prison abolitionists: 

Perspective 1: The imprisonment of a human being is inherently immoral, and while total abolition of the current prison system is not an easy task, it is possible. The first step towards abolition is admitting that prisons cannot be reformed, as a carceral system is founded on brutality and contempt for those imprisoned. Additionally, the current system works to disproportionally imprison poor and working-class people, so its abolition would ensure progress towards equality. Abolitionists see many similarities between today's carceral system and the slavery establishment of the past, and would in fact say that the current system is simply reformed enslavement which perpetuates the same oppressive and discriminatory patterns. But just as superficial reforms could not alter the brutality of the slave system, reforms cannot change a system rooted in racism.

Perspective 2: The abolitionist message requires changing our language and definitions of punishment “treatment” and “inmates”. In order to break away from the prison system, we must use honest language and take back the power of our vocabulary. 

Perspective 3: Imprisonment is not a proper response to deviance. Abolitionists promote reconciliation rather than punishment, a perspective seeking to restore both the criminal and the victim while limiting the disruption of their lives in the process.

Perspective 4: Abolitionists advocate for changes beneficial to the prisoner but do so while remaining a non-member of the system. In a similar fashion, abolitionists respect the personhood of system managers but oppose their role in the perpetuation of an oppressive system. 

Perspective 5: The abolitionist message extends farther than the traditional helping relationship; Abolitionists identify themselves as allies of the imprisoned, respecting their perspectives as well as the requirements for abolition.

Perspective 6:The empowerment of prisoners and ex-prisoners is crucial to the abolitionist movement. Programs and resources dedicated to reinstating that which has been stripped from them by the prison system are fundamental in putting power back in their own hands.

Perspective 7: Abolitionists believe that citizens are the true source of institutional power which can lead to the abolition of the prison system. Giving or limiting support from certain policies and practices will enable the progression of the abolitionist movement. 

Perspective 8: Abolitionists believe that crime is a consequence of a broken society, and recourses must be used towards social programs instead of the funding of prisons. They advocate for public solutions to public problems, producing effects which will benefit everyone in society. 

Perspective 9: An emphasis is placed on the correction of society rather than the correction of an individual. It is only in a corrected or caring community that individual redemption and rehabilitation can be achieved. Thus, abolitionists see that the only adequate alternative to the prison system is building a kind of society which has no need for prisons. 

Abolitionists like Angela Davis recommend four measures as a way to deal with violent and other serious crimes: (1) make mental health care available to all (2) everyone should have access to affordable treatment for substance use disorders (3) make a stronger effort to rehabilitate those who commit criminal offences and (4) employ reparative or restorative justice measures as an accountability tool to reconcile offenders with their victims and undo or compensate the harm done.

Organizations such as INCITE! and Sista II Sista that support women of color who are survivors of interpersonal violence argue that the criminal justice system does not protect marginalized people who are victims in relationships. Instead, victims, especially those who are poor, minorities, transgender or gender non-conforming can experience additional violence at the hands of the state. Instead of relying on the criminal justice system, these organizations work to implement community accountability practices, which often involve collectively-run processes of intervention initiated by a survivor of violence to try to hold the person who committed violence accountable by working to meet a set of demands.
For organizations outside the United States see, e.g. Justice Action, Australia.

Some anarchists and socialists contend that a large part of the problem is the way the judicial system deals with prisoners, people, and capital.  According to Marxists, in capitalist economies incentives are in place to expand the prison system and increase the prison population. This is evidenced by the creation of private prisons in America and corporations like CoreCivic, formerly known as Correction Corporation of America (CCA). Its shareholders benefit from the expansion of prisons and tougher laws on crime. More prisoners is seen as beneficial for business. Some anarchists contend that with the destruction of capitalism, and the development of social structures that would allow for the self-management of communities, property crimes would largely vanish. There would be fewer prisoners, they assert, if society treated people more fairly, regardless of gender, color, ethnic background, sexual orientation, education, etc.

The demand for prison abolition is a feature of anarchist criminology, which argues that prisons encourage recidivism and should be replaced by efforts to rehabilitate offenders and reintegrate them into communities.

See also 

 Convict lease system, abolished by Presidential order in 1942
 Criminal justice reform
 Emma Goldman
 Exile
 Frankie Boyle
 Louk Hulsman
 Nils Christie
 Penal labor
 Prison-industrial complex
 Pacifism
 Police abolition movement

References

Further Reading

Sources

Notes 

 
Criminal justice reform
Penal imprisonment